Chris Hansen (born 1959) is an American TV journalist.

Chris Hansen may also refer to:

 Chris Hansen (attorney), American Civil Liberties Union attorney
 Chris Hansen (footballer) (born 1956), Australian rules footballer
 Chris R. Hansen (born 1968), American hedge fund manager
 Chris Hansen (politician) (born 1975), member of the Colorado House of Representatives
 Chris Hansen, owner of the record label No Sleep Records

See also 
 Chris Hanson (disambiguation)